PHR might refer to: 

Parts per Hundred Rubber, a measure used by rubber chemists to depict what amount of certain ingredients are needed, especially pre-vulcanization
Personal health record, an individual's health and medical information as collected by the individual
Physicians for Human Rights, an international non-governmental organization 
Physicians for Human Rights-Israel, an Israeli-Palestinian NGO based in Jaffa
Principality of Hutt River, a former independent micronation on the Western Australian continent.
Professional in Human Resources, a certification for human resource professionals
Public Health Reports, a medical journal
 Pahari-Pothwari (ISO 639-3 phr), an Indo-Aryan language